Dzik is a  Polish-made multi-purpose infantry mobility vehicle. Produced by the AMZ works in Kutno, it is designed for serving both the patrol and intervention roles, as well as an armoured personnel carrier for use by various peace-keeping and policing forces. Its armour provides defence against 7.62 mm bullets. The Dzik-3 also boasts bulletproof windows, puncture-proof tires and smoke launchers.

The Dzik cars are powered by a turbodiesel engine that produces 146 hp (107 kW) with a  displacement.

Variants
The Dzik is issued in four variants based on the same chassis:
 Dzik-AT (AT antyterrorystyczny - anti-terrorist) with 3 doors, room for up to 8 people and 10 firing ports.
 Dzik-2 with 5 doors, room for up to 8 people, 8 firing ports and a rotating machine gun turret in the roof.
 Dzik-3 (also known by the Iraqi designation Ain Jaria 1) with 4 doors, room for up to 11 soldiers, 13 firing ports, machine gun turret and two double smoke grenade launchers.
 Dzik Cargo with 2 doors, 2 firing ports, room for up to 3 people and a cargo hold.
Customers can also get Dziks in ambulance and anti-aircraft versions.

A number of Dzik-AT cars were bought by the Polish Ministerstwo Spraw Wewnętrznych i Administracji and are to replace obsolete BTR-60 APCs as the basic anti-terrorist vehicle in Polish service. Dzik-2 were used by the Polish Military Police (Żandarmeria Wojskowa), and were also known under a nickname Gucio (a diminutive of Gustav). They were withdrawn from service in 2014.

The Dzik-3 was specifically designed to fit the needs of the New Iraqi Army, where it is adopted as the basic armoured personnel carrier. , 600 Dzik-3 were ordered, with an option to extend the order to 1,000 or more.

Operators

Current operators
 
 Iraqi Army - Dzik-3
 
 ARAS - Dzik-AT
 
 SPAP - Dzik-AT
 
 UAF - Dzik-2

Gallery

See also 
 Tur (military vehicle)

References

External links 

 Dzik at producer's website (en)
Iraqis Take Lead in Tactical Ops With Up-Armored Vehicles (en)
 History of "Dziks" (pl)

AMZ vehicles
Armoured cars of Poland
Armoured personnel carriers of Poland
Military light utility vehicles
Military vehicles introduced in the 2000s
Armoured personnel carriers of the post–Cold War period